was a Japanese football player. He played for Japan national team.

Club career
Kano was born in Tokyo on October 31, 1920. He played for Waseda WMW, which was composed alumni players from his alma mater, Waseda University. In 1940, he won second place at the 1940 Emperor's Cup. That tournament was the last Emperor's Cup before World War II, when it was suspended from 1941 to 1945.

National team career
In March 1951, when Kano was 30 years old, he was selected for the Japan national team and their first game since the end of World War II, the 1951 Asian Games. At that competition, he debuted against Iran on March 7. He also played at the 1954 Asian Games and scored two goals. He played seven games and scored two goals for Japan until 1954.

On June 4, 2000, Kano died of heart failure in Ota, Tokyo at the age of 79.

National team statistics

Honours
Japan
Asian Games Bronze medal: 1951

References

External links
 
 Japan National Football Team Database

1920 births
2000 deaths
Waseda University alumni
Association football people from Tokyo
Japanese footballers
Japan international footballers
Asian Games medalists in football
Asian Games bronze medalists for Japan
Footballers at the 1951 Asian Games
Medalists at the 1951 Asian Games
Footballers at the 1954 Asian Games
Association football forwards